Weston-super-Mare Cricket Club is an amateur cricket club based in the town of Weston-super-Mare, Somerset, England. Since the club's formation in 1845, they have nurtured a number of players who have gone on to play for Somerset County Cricket Club and a select few who have gone on to play for the England Cricket Team. The first team currently play in the West of England Premier League, an ECB Premier League, the highest level of recreational club cricket in England and Wales.

The club's finest hour came in 1986, when they were runners-up in the ECB National Club Cricket Championship, losing to Stourbridge at Lord's.

The club's home matches are played at the Devonshire Park Ground in Weston-super-Mare, which has hosted two List A matches involving Somerset in the John Player League, and several other matches involving Somerset's Second XI.

Senior honours
ECB National Club Cricket Championship
Runners-Up (1): 1986
West of England Premier League
Premier One Runners-Up (1): 2009
Premier Two Winners (1): 2006
Premier Two Runners-Up (2): 2002, 2013
Somerset Division Winners (1): 2017
Premier One 2nd XI Runners-Up (1): 2008
Premier Two 2nd XI Winners (3): 2001, 2002, 2012
Western League
Winners (1): 1991
Runners-Up (2): 1989, 1990
2nd XI Championship Winners (3): 1989, 1990, 1991
Alliance League
1st XI Winners (1): 1986
2nd XI Winners (1): 1986
Somerset Cricket League
Premier Division Winners (1): 1985
Premier Division Runners-Up (1): 1982
Division One 2nd XI Winners (2): 1984, 1985
Division One 2nd XI Runners-Up (2): 1982, 1983
Division Six Runners-Up (1): 2017
Somerset Major Cup
Winners (4): 1971, 1983, 2008, 2014
Runners-Up (2): 2007, 2012
Somerset Intermediate Cup
Winners (4): 1990, 1991, 1993, 2001
Runners-Up (3): 2004, 2006, 2011
Somerset Minor Cup
Winners (3): 1984, 1985, 1986
Steelstock Major Cup
Winners (3): 1987, 1989, 1991
Steelstock Minor Cup
Winners (2): 1986, 1988
North Somerset Cricket League
Division 1 Winners (3): 1984, 1991, 1995
Division 2 Winners (1): 1983
Division 3 Winners (1): 1984
Division 3 Runners-Up (1): 2008
Somerset Ladies Cricket League
Winners (4): 1998, 2007, 2010, 2011
Runners-Up (2): 2006, 2013

Youth honours

North Somerset Youth Cricket League
U17 Winners (11): 1985, 1987, 1989, 1993, 1994, 1999, 2000, 2004, 2005, 2006, 2008
U17 Runners-Up (2): 2001, 2011
U15 Winners (9): 1985, 1992, 1993, 1996, 1998, 2002, 2005, 2006, 2017, 2019
U13 Winners (8): 1991, 1993, 1994, 1995, 1996, 2004, 2007, 2013, 2019
U11 Winners (7): 1995, 2005, 2006, 2007, 2008, 2011, 2015
U11 Runners-Up (1): 2017
North Somerset Youth Cricket Cup
U17 Winners (18): 1965, 1968, 1971, 1973, 1975, 1978, 1981, 1984, 1985, 1987, 1988, 1994, 1995, 1999, 2000, 2004, 2008, 2011
U15 Winners (6): 1996, 1997, 1999, 2002, 2006, 2009, 2019
U13 Winners (8): 1986, 1990, 1991, 1993, 1995, 1996, 1997, 2004, 2018, 2019
North Somerset Youth Cricket Plate
U15 Winners (1): 2017
U13 Winners (1): 2017
U13 Runners-Up: 2019

Notable current and former players 
Nick Evans - Formerly of Somerset
Ryan Davies - Formerly of Durham, Somerset, England U19s and Kent
Robin d'Souza - Currently of the Goa cricket team
Gemaal Hussain - Formerly of Somerset and Gloucestershire
Jon Moss - Formerly of Victorian Bushrangers and Derbyshire
Michael Munday - Formerly of Somerset
Perry Rendell - Formerly of Somerset & Combined Universities
Brian Rose - Formerly of Somerset County Cricket Club and England, and previously Somerset Director of Cricket
David Stiff - Formerly of Somerset, Yorkshire, Leicestershire and Kent
Peter Trego - Formerly of Nottinghamshire, Somerset, Kent and Middlesex
Rob Turner - Formerly of Somerset and England A
Simon Turner - Formerly of Somerset
Charl Willoughby - Formerly of South Africa, Somerset, Leicestershire & Essex
Paul van Meekeren - Currently of Gloucestershire and Holland, formerly of Somerset and Durham.

References

External links
Weston-super-Mare Cricket Club - official site
West of England Premier League - official site
North Somerset Cricket League - official site

English club cricket teams
Sport in Weston-super-Mare
Cricket in Somerset
Cricket clubs established in 1845
1845 establishments in England